Antonello Tabacco (born 25 February 1990) is an Italian football defender who currently plays for Bassano Virtus, on loan from Pescara.

References

External links
 
 

1990 births
Living people
People from Avezzano
Italian footballers
A.S.D. Sangiovannese 1927 players
Delfino Pescara 1936 players
A.S.D. Città di Foligno 1928 players
Bassano Virtus 55 S.T. players
Avezzano Calcio players
Association football defenders
Sportspeople from the Province of L'Aquila
Footballers from Abruzzo